Ricky Barkley Jean Francois (born November 23, 1986) is a former American football defensive tackle. He was drafted by the San Francisco 49ers in the seventh round of the 2009 NFL Draft, and played college football at Louisiana State University (LSU). He has also played for the Indianapolis Colts, Washington Redskins, Green Bay Packers, New England Patriots and Detroit Lions.

College career
As a member of the National Championship winning 2007 LSU Tigers football team, he was the defensive MVP of the 2008 BCS National Championship Game. Jean Francois was also a member of the LSU track & field team.

Professional career

San Francisco 49ers
Jean Francois was drafted by the San Francisco 49ers in the seventh round, 244th overall, in the 2009 NFL Draft. He became famous among 49ers fans for his "Peanut Butter Jelly Dance".

In the 2012 season, Jean Francois and the 49ers appeared in Super Bowl XLVII. In the game, he had two combined tackles as the 49ers fell to the Baltimore Ravens by a score of 34–31.

Indianapolis Colts
Jean Francois signed with the Colts on March 14, 2013. He was released on February 23, 2015.

Washington Redskins
Jean Francois signed a three-year, $9 million contract with the Washington Redskins on February 26, 2015.

On March 15, 2017, Jean Francois was released by the Redskins.

Green Bay Packers
On March 24, 2017, Jean Francois signed a one-year, $3 million contract with the Green Bay Packers. He was released by the Packers on September 12, 2017. He re-signed with the Packers on September 21, 2017. On November 1, 2017, Jean Francois was again released by the Packers.

New England Patriots
On November 7, 2017, Jean Francois signed with the New England Patriots. He was released by the Patriots on December 2, 2017. He was re-signed on December 13, 2017.

Detroit Lions
On July 25, 2018, Jean Francois signed a one-year deal with the Detroit Lions.

Personal life
Ricky Jean Francois's brother's name is Michael Jean Francois. He is of Haitian descent.

References

External links

Washington Redskins bio
Indianapolis Colts bio
San Francisco 49ers bio 
LSU Tigers bio 

1986 births
Living people
Miami Carol City Senior High School alumni
Players of American football from Miami
American football defensive tackles
American football defensive ends
American sportspeople of Haitian descent
LSU Tigers football players
San Francisco 49ers players
Indianapolis Colts players
Washington Redskins players
Green Bay Packers players
New England Patriots players
Detroit Lions players